The Minister for the Digital Economy and Communications is a minister in the government of New Zealand with responsibilities including the delivery of the government's digital strategy, digital services delivery, regulation of telecommunications and postal sectors, broadband infrastructure, and the radio spectrum. The portfolio is supported by the Ministry of Business, Innovation and Employment, the Department of Internal Affairs, and the Department of the Prime Minister and Cabinet.

The position was created on 6 November 2020. Its purpose was to simplify and streamline digital workstreams across the New Zealand government. The minister shares responsibility for cyber security matters with the minister responsible for the Government Communications Security Bureau. Former politician Peter Dunne has said the position is "extremely important", "given New Zealand’s position as one of the world's most digitally advanced governments". 

 the present minister is Ginny Andersen.

List of ministers
Key

References

Digital Economy and Communications